Tubing may refer to:

 Tube (fluid conveyance), a long hollow cylinder used for moving fluids or to protect cables and wires
 Pipe (fluid conveyance), a tubular section used to convey substances that can flow
 Piping, a system of pipes used to convey fluids
 Plumbing, any system that conveys fluids for a wide range of applications
 Hose, a flexible hollow tube designed to carry fluids
 Structural tubing, a component of a hollow structural section
 Brass instrument tubing
 Tubing (recreation), the act of riding an inner tube

See also
 
 
 Tube (disambiguation)
 Tub (disambiguation)